The Florida Complex League Red Sox are a professional baseball team competing in the rookie-level  Florida Complex League (FCL) of Minor League Baseball. The team is owned and operated by the Boston Red Sox of Major League Baseball (MLB). Prior to 2021, the team was known as the Gulf Coast League Red Sox. The team is located in Fort Myers, Florida, and plays its home games at JetBlue Park in the Fenway South complex.

The team is composed mainly of players who are in their first year of professional baseball, either as draftees or non-drafted free agents from the United States, Canada, the Dominican Republic and Venezuela, among other countries. Injured players from the major-league Red Sox and their minor-league system occasionally play rookie-level games as their first step on a rehabilitation assignment.

History
In 1988, the Boston Red Sox and Seattle Mariners fielded a cooperative rookie-level team in the Arizona League (AZL), known as the AZL Mariners/Red Sox. The cooperative was not renewed beyond that single season.

In 1989, the Red Sox began fielding their own rookie-level team in the Gulf Coast League (GCL). The team first played in Winter Haven, Florida, moved to City of Palms Park in Fort Myers in 1993, then moved to its current facility in 2012. Prior to the 2021 season, the Gulf Coast League was renamed as the Florida Complex League (FCL).

Notable players
At least one National Baseball Hall of Fame inductee has played for the team, Jeff Bagwell in 1989. Various players who have been MLB All-Stars have played for the team; those who were selected as All-Stars multiple times in their careers include: Carl Crawford, Carl Everett, Nomar Garciaparra, Jon Lester, Hanley Ramírez, Anthony Rizzo, and Chris Sale.

Yearly team records

The team has finished first in its division 12 times, most recently in 2018. The team has won the league championship three times: 2006, 2014, and 2015. The team's best record came in 2015 when the club was 41–17, a .707 winning percentage.

Roster

References

External links
 Official website
The Baseball Cube – Gulf Coast Red Sox (1989–present)
Baseball Reference – Gulf Coast League Encyclopedia and History

Gu
Florida Complex League teams
Professional baseball teams in Florida
Baseball teams established in 1989
1989 establishments in Florida
Baseball in Fort Myers, Florida